Muriel  Lake is a  lake located  on Vancouver Island west of Clayoquot Arm and north of Kennedy River.

References

Alberni Valley
Lakes of Vancouver Island
Clayoquot Land District